kadenze.com, operated by  Kadenze, Inc. ("Kadenze"), is a for-profit massive open online course (MOOC) provider that offers courses geared toward art, music, and creative technology, fields which are falling behind other fields such as computer science in terms of number of courses offered in the MOOC space. It was launched on June 16, 2015 with 18 academic partners including:  Stanford University, Princeton University, UCLA, California Institute of the Arts, School of Art Institute of Chicago, Maryland Institute College of Art, Goldsmiths College, MassArt, Seoul Institute of the Arts, Paris College of Art, National University of Singapore, Cornish College of Art, University of Texas at Austin, Rhode Island School of Design, Pacific Northwest College of Art, Arizona State University, Columbus College of Art and Design, and School of Visual Arts.

Platform and technology 
The primary method of learning on kadenze.com is through video-based lectures. Courses typically range from five to eight sessions long, with each session broken up into a group of short lessons.

A course can run in either Scheduled or Adaptive mode. A Scheduled course follows a set calendar, with a course start/end date, prescribed due dates for assignments, and new lecture content that is released on specific dates (e.g. once a week). Adaptive courses are more flexible in terms of scheduling, allowing learners to initiate sessions and progress through course material at their own pace. While all video are immediately accessible when running in Adaptive mode, assignments are “unlocked” upon completing the previous assignment. A suggested due date of 1-week is set to help learners stay on track, however, learners can go at their own pace.

Core to the used Kannu platform is the ability to embed media (image, video, audio) nearly anywhere on the platform, such as a course's forums and gallery. This enables learners and customers/purchasers of the Premium membership to engage with one another's works without the need to leave the learning environment. This also expands the possibilities of peer assessment based learning methods (which is a common form of assessment on MOOC platforms).

Membership 
kadenze.com offers a tier-based membership model. The free tier enables learners to watch all lecture material, and to participate in the course forums. A fee-based Premium membership allows students to have full participation in courses, submit assignments, receive grades and feedback, collaborate with peers, build their online portfolio, and gain eligibility to receive a verified Certificate of Accomplishment if a course is completed satisfactorily. Additionally, many courses offer Premium Members access to exclusive student discounts from the kadenze.com industrial partners. Some courses on kadenze.com are also offered as credit-eligible, meaning that learners can take the course for actual college credit from the partnering institution. Many of the individual courses in area of sub specialization are available as part of a Program.

History 
As of February 2017 kadenze.com has expanded its partner list to 31 educational partners including two non-profit organizations. Today, kadenze.com offers approximately 100 courses in a number of creativity related fields including business, music, music technology, visual arts, creative computing, computational graphics, design, history and culture, fashion, entertainment technology, math, game design, film, curation, and web development. Many of these courses are similar to courses already taught at partner non-profit public and private institutions, and feature the staff and faculty from these partner institutions. The kadenze.com website does not disclose the terms of agreement or the level of financial remuneration it offers the staff and faculty already holding positions at non-profit partner institutions. Additionally, Kadenze has established partnerships with industrial for-profit partners including Ableton, Adobe, Cognella, Focusrite, Manning Publications, Output, Autodesk, Native Instruments, Novation, and RME. These courses are offered under the Kadenze Academy banner.  Some of the industrial partners offer kadenze.com premium members additional benefits. Similarly, the kadenze.com website does not disclose the terms of agreement it has with industrial partners and whether the industrial partners also have pre-existing agreements with partner institution, which is likely due to commercial sensitivities.

On November 19, 2015, Kadenze launched Kannu, a learning management system geared toward creative education, music, arts, and design. Early adopters of the customized platform on campus were California Institute of the Arts, Otis College of Art and Design Rhode Island School of Design, Goldsmiths College, Stanford University and non academic institutions such as Unity and  Maker Media Inc.

In November 2016, EdSurge did a review of the progress on Kadenze, one year after launching

References 

American educational websites
Educational technology companies of the United States
Open educational resources
Software companies based in California
Software companies of the United States